Denis Ulfatovich Magadiyev (born 18 January 1992) is a Russian professional football player. He plays for FC Tyumen.

Club career
He made his Russian Football National League debut for FC Yenisey Krasnoyarsk on 25 May 2013 in a game against FC Shinnik Yaroslavl.

External links
 
 

1992 births
People from Sterlitamak
Living people
Russian footballers
Russia youth international footballers
Association football defenders
FC Yenisey Krasnoyarsk players
FC Sokol Saratov players
FC Shinnik Yaroslavl players
FC Luch Vladivostok players
FC Irtysh Omsk players
FC Tyumen players
FC Akron Tolyatti players
Sportspeople from Bashkortostan